Purpuricenus laetus is a species of beetle in the family Cerambycidae.

Subspecies
 Purpuricenus laetus congoanus (Aurivillius, 1911) 
 Purpuricenus laetus cubalicus Kuntzen, 1915 
 Purpuricenus laetus fuelleborni Kuntzen, 1915 
 Purpuricenus laetus glauningi Kuntzen, 1915 
 Purpuricenus laetus kambanus Kuntzen, 1915 
 Purpuricenus laetus laetus (Thomson, 1864) 
 Purpuricenus laetus lengerkeni Kuntzen, 1915 
 Purpuricenus laetus machadoi Lepesme, 1947

Description
Purpuricenus laetus can reach a length of about

Distribution
This species is present in Angola, Botswana, Democratic Republic of the Congo, Kenya, Mozambique, Namibia, South Africa, Tanzania, Zambia and Zimbabwe.

References
 Biolib
 Worldwide Cerambycoidea Photo Gallery
 Beetles of Africa

Trachyderini